Ács is a town in Komárom-Esztergom county, northern Hungary.

Geography
Ács is located in Komárom District on the eastern side of the Little Hungarian Plain near where the Concó River enters the Danube.
It is below the Bársonyosi Hills, at the point where the Székes joins the Concó, three kilometer south of the Danube and eight kilometers southwest of the city of Komárno.

History
Ács was a settlement in Roman times, in the province of Pannonia. There were two Roman castra, Ad Mures and Ad Statuas, in the area.

An early mention in the 13th century called the place Iwan de As; and a document in 1346 called it Alchy.

In 1970 it was declared a large commune (Nagyközség); and on 1 July 2007 it received town status.

Twin towns – sister cities
Ács is twinned with:

  Zlatná na Ostrove, Slovakia  
  Brăduț, Romania
  Steinau, Germany

Notes and references

External links

  in Hungarian
 Street map (Hungarian)
 Aerial photographs of Ács

Populated places in Komárom-Esztergom County